Bernadette Peters (née Lazzara; born February 28, 1948) is an American actress, singer, and children's book author. She is a critically acclaimed Broadway performer, having received seven nominations for Tony Awards, winning two (plus an honorary award), and nine nominations for Drama Desk Awards, winning three.  Peters has appeared extensively in film and on television, having been nominated for four Emmy Awards and three Golden Globe Awards, winning one.  She has also recorded solo albums, and four of her cast albums have won Grammy Awards.

Performances

Stage

Broadway

Other

Film

Television

Discography 
Solo recordings
 Bernadette Peters (1980) MCA. Billboard 200 #114 (retitled and expanded as Bernadette in a 1992 CD reissue)
 "Gee Whiz" (1980) Billboard Hot 100 #31 (single)
 Now Playing (1981) MCA US Billboard 200 #151
 I'll Be Your Baby Tonight (1996) Angel Records – Grammy Award nominee
 Sondheim, Etc. – Bernadette Peters Live At Carnegie Hall (1997) Angel Records – Grammy Award nominee
 Bernadette Peters Loves Rodgers and Hammerstein (2002) Angel Records – Grammy Award nominee
 Sondheim Etc., Etc. Live At Carnegie Hall: The Rest of It (2005) Angel Records
 "Kramer's Song" (2008) Blue Apple Books (single)
 "Stella's Song" (2010) Blue Apple Books (single)

Cast recordings
 George M! – Sony (1968)
 Dames At Sea – Columbia Masterworks (1969)
 Mack and Mabel – MCA (1974)
 Sunday in the Park with George – RCA Records (1984) – Grammy Award winner (Best Cast Show Album, 1985)
 Song and Dance – The Songs – RCA Victor (1985)
 Into The Woods – RCA Victor Records (1988) – Grammy Award winner (Best Musical Cast Show Album, 1989)
 The Goodbye Girl – Columbia Records (1993)
 Anyone Can Whistle Live At Carnegie Hall – Columbia Records (1995)
 Annie Get Your Gun The New Broadway Cast Recording – Angel Records (1999) – Grammy Award winner (Best Musical Show Album, 2000)
 Gypsy The New Broadway Cast Recording – Angel Records (2003) – Grammy Award winner (Best Musical Show Album, 2004)
 Sherry! – Studio Cast Recording – Angel Records (2004)
 Legends of Broadway–Bernadette Peters Compilation (2006) – Sony Masterworks Broadway (Original versions of songs from Dames At Sea, Annie Get Your Gun, Anyone Can Whistle, Sunday in the Park with George, Mack and Mabel, Song and Dance, Into The Woods and Gypsy)
 Follies – PS Classics (2011)

Other recordings
 Dress Casual – selections from Evening Primrose with Mandy Patinkin – CBS Records (1990)
 Flirting with the Edge – John Whelan – Narada (1998)
 Dewey Doo-It Helps Owlie Fly Again – Randall Fraser Publishing (2005)
 "Eloise" stories – audiobook, Simon & Schuster Audio (2015)

Concerts
Major concerts
 Various venues, summer of 1989: 10-city concert tour with Peter Allen.
 Hollywood Bowl, Los Angeles, California on September 6 and 7, 1996 (solo concert).
 Carnegie Hall, New York City on December 9, 1996 (solo concert with guest singers/dancers, recorded on CD).
 Sydney Opera House, Sydney, Australia on January 7 and 8, 1998 (solo concert).
 Royal Festival Hall, London on September 17, 1998 (solo concert with guest singers/dancers, recorded on video).
 Radio City Music Hall, New York City on June 19, 2002 (solo concert with guest singers).
 Lincoln Center (Avery Fisher Hall), New York City, on May 1, 2006 (solo concert).
 Adelaide Cabaret Festival, Adelaide, Australia, on June 6 and 7, 2009 (solo concert). Peters headlined, and the concert was televised on June 27, 2009, on Foxtel. A DVD of the concert was released in Australia in June 2010.
 Benefit concert, "Bernadette Peters: A Special Concert for Broadway Barks Because Broadway Cares", Minskoff Theatre, New York City on November 9, 2009.

Other notable concerts
 "Sondheim: A Celebration at Carnegie Hall" – June 10, 1992 (broadcast on PBS Great Performances in 1993), singing "Not a Day Goes By" and "Sunday"
 "Hey Mr. Producer! The Musical World of Cameron MacKintosh" – June 7, 1998, singing, among others, "Unexpected Song", "Being Alive" and "You Gotta Have a Gimmick"
 Hollywood Bowl Sondheim Concert – July 8, 2005, performing in the "Opening Doors Medley" and "Being Alive".
 "Sondheim: The Birthday Concert", the New York Philharmonic at Lincoln Center's Avery Fisher Hall, a celebration of Sondheim's 80th birthday – March 15 and 16, 2010. Peters sang "Move On" with Mandy Patinkin and "Not a Day Goes By".

References

External links
 
 
 
 

Actress filmographies
American filmographies